Greece's Next Top Model, or otherwise  Next Top Model, is a Greek reality television series that forms part of the Top Model series. Greek model Vicky Kaya assumed the role of Tyra Banks from the original series as the head of the search as well as a mentor for the contestants for the first two seasons and from season three all four judges are the head of the search for the contestants. The basic premise of the series is a group of young contestants who live together in a house for several weeks while taking part in various challenges, photo shoots and meetings with members of the modeling industry. Normally, one poor-performing contestant is eliminated each week until the last contestant remaining is declared "Greece's Next Top Model" and receives a modeling contract along with other associated prizes.

The first season premiered on ANT1 on October 12, 2009 and concluded after two seasons on February 21, 2011. During that time, ANT1 decided not to greenlight a third season.

In May 2018, it was announced that Star Channel was in talks with Vicky Kaya to revive the series for a new season. In June 2018, it was announced the new season is scheduled to premiere in October 2018 with Vicky Kaya returning not as a host but only as a judge alongside three new judges, Dimitris Skoulos, a fashion photographer, Angelos Bratis, a fashion designer, and Iliana Papageorgiou, a fashion/runway model. The third series premiered on September 10, 2018. Following its success, a fourth season with the same judges and the same format premiered on September 8, 2019. The show will return for a fifth season on the same channel in September 2020, with a change in the jury but also in the format. Genevieve Majari will replace Papageorgiou as the new judge. On April 15, 2021, Star Channel announced that after 5 seasons, Vicky Kaya will not be returning for the sixth season. On May 19, 2021, it was announced that model Ismini Papavlasopoulou, is the new judge in the sixth season, replacing Kaya.

Seasons 1-4 and 7 each consisted of a cast of 18–26 female contestants. Seasons 5 & 6, the show featured both female and male contestants.

Show format

Next Top Model contained approximately eighteen episodes and started with eighteen (first season) or twenty (second season) contestants. At the end of most episodes, one contestant was eliminated. In rare cases, a double elimination or no elimination was given by consensus of the judging panel. Makeovers were administered to contestants early in the season (usually after the first or second elimination in the finals) and a trip to one or more international destinations was scheduled nearer the end of the season when a few girls remained in the competition.

Each episode of Next Top Model covered the events of roughly a week of real time and featured a fashion challenge, photo shoot, a critique of each contestant and her performance by the judging panel led by Vicky Kaya, and the elimination of one or more contestants. The panel included the former model Jenny Balatsinou, fashion designer Christoforos Kotentos and noted photographer Charis Christopoulos. Each episode was usually associated with a theme in the world of modelling the girls need to excel in to become a successful fashion model.

An episode usually began with the contestants receiving training in an area concurrent with the week's theme. For example, contestants were coached in runway walking, posing or applying make-up to suit various occasions. A related challenge soon followed and a winner was chosen by a judge. She received some sort of prize and was usually allowed to share the benefits with a certain number of other contestants of her choice.

The next segment was a photo shoot, and each contestant's performance reflected heavily on her judging for that week. It featured photo shoots such as bikini shots, beauty shots and posing in extreme circumstances.

The final segment of each episode was judging. A panel of judges fronted by the host and a number of fashion "experts" assessed task performance and potential. Each contestant's photo was then shown and evaluated by the judging panel. After all photos were evaluated, the contestants left the room as the judges deliberated. The elimination process was ceremonious, as one by one the host revealed and handed out photos to the contestants that were not eliminated, in order of merit, occasionally saying something along the lines of, "Congratulations. You are still in the running to becoming the "Next Top Model". The last two contestants standing were brought up as the "bottom two", and the host critiqued each one before revealing which of the two was eliminated.

Judges and other staff members

Table notes:

Seasons

References

External links
 Official website (ANT1)
 Official website (Star Channel)

ANT1 original programming
Star Channel (Greek TV channel) original programming
Greece
Greek reality television series
2009 Greek television series debuts
2011 Greek television series endings
2018 Greek television series debuts
2010s Greek television series
2020s Greek television series
Greek television series based on American television series